Şeref Eroğlu (born 25 November 1975, in Kahramanmaraş) is a Turkish wrestler. He is the current president of the Turkish Wrestling Federation.

Career 
He was born on November 25, 1975 in Dereköy, Kahramanmaraş. He started wrestling with karakucak and entered Sivas Pamukpınar Wrestling Training Center in 1988. In 1990, he wore the national swimsuit for the first time in Hungary and became the Stars Greco-Roman World Champion. He completed his secondary and high school education at Sivas Pamukpınar Teacher's High School, his high school education at Gazi University Physical Education and Sports School, his master's degree at Kahramanmaraş Sütçü İmam University, and he is currently continuing his doctorate education in Sports Management at Hitit University Faculty of Sports Sciences. He wore more than 1200 national jerseys and won 110 medals in international championships and tournaments. In 1997 and 1998, he was selected as the World's Best and Most Technical Wrestler by UWW. After ending his wrestling career in 2008, he went to the USA to study languages. He is a Delegate of the Turkish National Olympic Committee, Club President of the Champions Wrestling Club and a member of the Technical Committee of the International Wrestling Federation (UWW). He is married and has 2 children.

He competed in the Men's Greco-Roman 66 kg at the 2004 Summer Olympics and won the silver medal. He is member of the İstanbul Büyükşehir Belediyesi S.K.

He is a world champion and has won four gold and one silver medals at the European Championships. In 1997 he was named Greco-Roman Wrestler of the Year by the International Federation of Associated Wrestling Styles (FILA).

Achievements
 1991 World Juniors Championships in Spain - bronze
 1992 World Juniors Championships in Colombia - gold
 1992 European Espoir Championships in Székesfehérvár, Hungary - 5th (Bantamweight)
 1993 World Espoir Championships in Greece - bronze
 1993 Mediterranean Games in Languedoc-Roussillon, France - bronze (Bantamweight)
 1994 World Championships in Tampere, Finland - 5th (Bantamweight)
 1994 European Espoir Championships in Istanbul, Turkey - gold (Bantamweight)
 1994 European Championships in Athens, Greece - gold (Bantamweight)
 1995 World Espoir Championships in Tehran, Iran - gold (Featherweight)
 1996 European Championships in Budapest, Hungary - gold (Bantamweight)
 1997 European Championships in Oulu, Finland - silver (Featherweight)
 1997 World Championships in Warsaw, Poland - gold (Featherweight)
 1998 European Championships in Minsk, Belarus - gold (Featherweight)
 1998 World Championships in Gävle, Sweden - silver (Featherweight)
 2001 European Championships in Istanbul, Turkey - gold (Featherweight)
 2004 Olympics in Athens, Greece - silver (Lightweight)

References

External links
 

1975 births
Sportspeople from Kahramanmaraş
Olympic wrestlers of Turkey
Wrestlers at the 1996 Summer Olympics
Wrestlers at the 2000 Summer Olympics
Turkish male sport wrestlers
Wrestlers at the 2004 Summer Olympics
Wrestlers at the 2008 Summer Olympics
Olympic silver medalists for Turkey
Living people
Olympic medalists in wrestling
Medalists at the 2004 Summer Olympics
Mediterranean Games bronze medalists for Turkey
Competitors at the 1993 Mediterranean Games
Mediterranean Games medalists in wrestling
21st-century Turkish people